Hure may refer to:

Hure, Gironde, commune in Gironde, France
Augusta Hure (1870–1953), French museum curator

Whore in German
in Mongolian "hure" means "camp/yurt"
Hure Banner, subdivision of Inner Mongolia, China
Hüree City, former name of Ulan Bator, Mongolia

See also
Huré